The 2007 American Basketball Association All-Star Game was held in Halifax, Nova Scotia at the 10,595 seat Halifax Metro Centre from January 27 to 28.

The first event, held on the 27th included a game between St. Francis Xavier University and Dalhousie University, the three point contest (Won by Aaron Cook of the Vermont Frost Heaves), the slam dunk contest (Won by Donald Beachem of the Texas Tycoons), the awards ceremony, and a small performance by Hedley and Classified to be MC'd by Farley Flex.

The second event on the 28th, included a game between Saint Mary's University and Memorial University, and the All-Star game; East versus West. The West defeated the East 138-123.

Facts
The Weekend was a success, with an estimated attendance of 2,500 for each event (5,000 total)
Hundreds of Rainmen T-shirts were handed out. The Rainmen are the local team of the host city, Halifax, and are beginning play next season.
213 Shots were taken in the game.
The All-Star MVP was Billy Knight of The Hollywood Fame. He had 25 points.
 Donald Beachem of the Texas Tycoons had 22 points.
This year's All-Star Game unlike the previous events, did not feature any former NBA player.

All-Star Teams

East-
(Coach) Will Voight, Vermont Frost Heaves 
Katu Davis, Detroit Panthers
Antonio Burks, Vermont Frost Heaves
Aaron Cook, Vermont Frost Heaves
James "Mook" Reaves, Rochester Razorsharks
Drew Washington, Maryland Nighthawks
Gregory Plummer, Strong Island Sound
Cedric McGinnis, Wilmington Sea Dawgs
Antoine Sims, Buffalo Silverbacks
Jerry Williams, Jacksonville Jam
Rob Sanders, Cape Cod Frenzy
Bobby St. Preux, Palm Beach Imperials
Cordell Jeanty, Quebec City Kebekwa
Robert Martin, Atlanta Vision 
Alex Hill, Orlando Aces

West-
(Coach) Bob Hoffman, Arkansas Aeros 
Mike Parker, Bellingham Slam
Donald Beachem, Texas Tycoons
Cardell Butler, San Diego Wildcats 
Billy Knight, The Hollywood Fame
Bobby Anderson, Peoria Kings
Terrell Hendricks, Maywood Buzz
Lonnie Randolph, Quad City Riverhawks
Curtis Haywood, Arkansas Aeros
Jeremy Bell, Arkansas Rivercatz
Jamel Staten, Minnesota Ripknees
Sun Yue, Beijing Aoshen Olympian
Chris Brown, Tennessee Mud Frogs
Tyrone Davis, Mississippi Miracles

See also
2006 ABA All-Star Game

External links
ABALive.com - All-Star Game - Official website of the 2007 ABA All-Star Game
 game results

ABA All-Star Games
2006–07 in American basketball